Byard Lancaster (August 6, 1942 – August 23, 2012) was an avant-garde jazz saxophonist and flutist.

Early life and education 
He attended two colleges, one for music, before attending the Berklee College of Music. He moved to New York City and participated in jam sessions which included saxophonist Archie Shepp and drummer Elvin Jones.

Career 
In 1965, he recorded Sunny Murray Quintet with the album's eponymous musician in New York, performed in the Parisian Actuel festival with him in 1969, and continued to work in the drummer's groups throughout his career. By the 1970s, Lancaster had played with musicians such as McCoy Tyner, Khan Jamal, and Sun Ra, as well as some outside of jazz, such as blues pianist Memphis Slim and blues guitarist Johnny Copeland.

Near the end of his life he performed regularly with cellist David Eyges and recorded as a leader and sideman for the record label Creative Improvised Music Projects. He died of pancreatic cancer on August 23, 2012.

Discography

As leader / co-leader
 1968: It's Not Up to Us (Vortex)
 1972: Live at Macalester College (Dogtown) as the J. R. Mitchell/Byard Lancaster Experience
 1974: Us (Palm) with Steve McCall, Sylvain Marc
 1974: Mother Africa (Palm) with Clint Jackson III
 1974: Exactement (Palm) with Keno Speller
 1977: Exodus (Philly Jazz)
 1977: Wildflowers: The New York Loft Jazz Sessions (Vol 2) (Casablanca/Douglas, Knit Classics) as Flight To Sanity
 1979: Funny Funky Rib Crib (Vendémiaire/Palm)
 1979: Documentation: The End of a Decade (Bellows)
 1979: Personal Testimony (Then and Now) (Concert Artists)
 1988: Lightnin' Strikes! (Black And Blue) with David Eyges
 1992: My Pure Joy  (Black Fire)
 1993: Worlds (Gazell)
 2000: Byard Lancaster Trio (Soultrane)
 2001: Philadelphia Spirit in New York (CIMP) with Odean Pope, Ed Crockett, J.R. Mitchell
 2003: The Out Cry (Lancaster) as Crockett, Mitchell & Lancaster
 2005: "A" Heavenly Sweetness (Isma'a, Discograph)
 2005: Pam Africa (Spirit Room)
 2006: Soul Unity (Heavenly Sweetness) as Thunderbird Service
 2006: Ancestral Link Hotel (Spirit Room)

As sideman
With Arcana
 Arc of the Testimony (Axiom, 1997)

With Big Youth
 A Luta Continua (Heartbeat, 1988)

With Change of the Century Orchestra
 Change of the Century Orchestra (JAS, 1999)

With Cool Waters
 Cool Waters (NCM, 1993)

With Johnny Copeland
 Copeland Special (Rounder, 1981)
 Jungle Swing (Verve, 1995)
 Texas Party (DeAgostini, 1996)
 Honky Tonkin (Bullseye, 1999)With Bill Dixon Intents and Purposes (RCA Victor, 1967)With David Eyges The Arrow (Music Unlimited, 1981)
 Crossroads (Music Unlimited, 1982)With fONKSQUISh Useless Education (Promo Preview, 2008)With Doug Hammond Folks (Idibib, 1980)With Kip Hanrahan Coup de tête (American Clavé, 1981)With Ronald Shannon Jackson Eye on You (About Time Records, 1980)
 Nasty (Moers Music, 1981)With Khan Jamal Infinity (Stash 278, 1984)
 Cubano Chant (Jambrio, 2000)
 Black Awareness (CIMP, 2005)
 Impressions of Coltrane (SteepleChase, 2009)With Dwight James Inner Heat (Cadence, 1983)With Bill Laswell Jazzonia (Douglas, 1998)
 Moody's Mood for Love (Douglas, 1998)
 Sacred System - Nagual Site (Wicklow/BMG, 1998)
 Operazone - The Redesign (Knitting Factory, 2000)
 Method of Defiance - Inamorata (Ohm Resistance, 2007)With Garrett List American Images (Horo, 1978)
 Fire & Ice (Lovely Music, 1982)
 The New York Takes (Carbon 7, 1998)With Geoff Leigh and Frank Wuyts From Here to Drums (No Man's Land, 1988)With Byron Morris and Gerald Wise Unity (EPI, 1972; Eremite, 2017)With Sunny Murray Sunny Murray (ESP Disk, 1966)
 An Even Break (Never Give a Sucker) (BYG, 1970)
 Charred Earth (Kharma, 1977)
 Wildflowers: The New York Loft Jazz Sessions (Vols 1 and 5) (Casablanca/Douglas, 1977; Knit Classics, 1999)With Robert Musso Innermedium (1999, DIW Records)With Errol Parker Graffiti (Sahara, 1980)With Odean Pope The Ponderer (Soul Note, 1990)With Vito Ricci Postones (Creation Production Company, 1983)With Sounds of Liberation New Horizons (Dogtown, 1972)With Pierre Van Dormael, David Linx and James Baldwin A Lover's Question (Label Bleu, 1999)With Marzette Watts Marzette Watts and Company (ESP-Disk, 1966)With Larry Young'''
 Heaven on Earth'' (Blue Note, 1968)

References

External links
Audio Recordings of WCUW Jazz Festivals - Jazz History Database (1)
Audio Recordings of WCUW Jazz Festivals - Jazz History Database (2)
 Official site

Berklee College of Music alumni
Jazz alto saxophonists
African-American musicians
1942 births
2012 deaths
CIMP artists
Musicians from Philadelphia
Deaths from pancreatic cancer
Avant-garde jazz saxophonists
Free jazz saxophonists
Black & Blue Records artists
20th-century African-American people
21st-century African-American people
20th-century saxophonists